Dan Debicella (born October 24, 1974) is a former State Senator and businessman, who represented the 21st district in the Connecticut State Senate. He was also the 2010 and 2014 Republican candidate for Connecticut's Fourth Congressional District.

Early life, education, and business career
Debicella was born in Bridgeport, Connecticut and raised in Shelton, where he currently resides. His father, Cal, was a policeman for the Bridgeport Police Department and his mother, Maggie, is a secretary for the federal judicial system. He graduated from Shelton High School in 1992. He holds a degree in finance, magna cum laude,  from the University of Pennsylvania's Wharton School of Business and an MBA from Harvard Business School, graduating in the top 5% of his class.

In his business career, Debicella worked as a consultant at McKinsey & Co., Director of Strategy at PepsiCo, and as an executive at Bridgewater Associates.  He continues to currently serves on the board of various community organizations.

Early political career
Debicella served on Shelton’s Board of Apportionment and Taxation for seven years, four as its chairman. Debicella acted as the Fairfield County regional chair for former New York City Mayor Rudy Giuliani's unsuccessful 2008 presidential campaign. He also worked for State Senator Doc Gunther as his campaign manager for several elections.

Connecticut Senate

Elections
Debicella decided to run for the Connecticut State Senate's 21st district in 2006 after longest-serving state legislator in the state's history, Doc Gunther, decided to retire. He defeated Democratic nominee Christopher Jones, 52%-48%. In 2008, he won re-election to a second term, defeating Democratic nominee Janice Andersen, 54%-46%.

Tenure
In the State Senate, Debicella was a Deputy Minority Leader. He represented eastern Fairfield County in parts of the towns of Monroe, Seymour, Stratford, and the entire city of Shelton (which is also his hometown).

He co-authored legislation that gave tax credits to businesses that create 10 or more jobs. Working with Republican Governor Jodi Rell, he supported a budget that increased state aid for education by 10-20% without raising taxes.

Committee assignments
Appropriations Committee
Higher Education and Employment Advancement Committee
Public Health Committee
Regulation Review Committee

Congressional elections

2010

Debicella decided to retire from the state legislature to run for Connecticut's 4th congressional district in 2010. On May 21, 2010, he won the endorsement of the Connecticut Republican Party at its convention. On August 10, 2010, Debicella won the Republican three-candidate primary field with 61% of the vote, defeating Robert Merkle and Rick Torres.

The general election between Debicella and incumbent Democrat Jim Himes was very competitive. The race made CNN’s Top 100 Most Competitive Races list, Politico’s Daily 10 (a tracker of the closest House Races), and Real Clear Politics’ list of “toss up” races. On November 2, he lost to Himes 53%-47%. Debicella won the following areas: Darien (67%), his hometown of Shelton (65%), New Canaan (65%), Easton (58%), Monroe (58%), Greenwich (55%), Oxford (55%), Ridgefield (54%), Wilton (54%), and Trumbull (53%). He lost Fairfield (49%), Redding (48%), Weston (47%), Westport (44%), Norwalk (40%), Stamford (39%),  and Bridgeport (16%).

2014

In September 2013, Debicella decided to run a rematch in the newly redrawn 4th district.

Electoral history

References

External links
Campaign website
Profile at Connecticut Senate Republicans
 
Campaign contributions at OpenSecrets.org

1974 births
Living people
Politicians from Bridgeport, Connecticut
People from Shelton, Connecticut
Wharton School of the University of Pennsylvania alumni
Harvard Business School alumni
Republican Party Connecticut state senators
McKinsey & Company people